Abu 'Abd Allah Muhammad b. 'Abd Allah b. Masarra b. Najih al-Jabali (883–931), was an Andalusian Muslim ascetic and scholar. He is considered one of the first Sufis as well as one of the first philosophers of Al-Andalus.

He is believed to have been Muwallad.

References

Sources
Arnaldez, R. (1979) The Encyclopaedia of Islam, iii, pp. 868 - 872, Leiden: Brill.  .
Asín Palacios, M. (1972) The Mystical Philosophy of Ibn Masarra and His Followers, trans. E.H. Douglas and H.W. Yoder, Leiden: Brill.
Asín Palacios, M. (in Spanish, 1914) Abenmassarra y su escuela : origenes de la filosofia Hispano-Musulmana. Madrid: Imprenta Iberica.
Chopra, R.M., "SUFISM", 2016, Anuradha Prakashan, New Delhi. .
Rossi, Caterina A. Il trono - Ibn Masarrah di Cordoba (883-931), il proto-filosofo arabo d'Andalusia, 2012, Moro Editore
Seyyed Hossein Nasr, Oliver Leaman, History of Islamic philosophy, Routledge, 1996, Chapter 20, p. 277-293  retrieved on 23-07-2010

External links
Ibn-Masarra at muslimphilosophy.com

883 births
931 deaths
9th-century people from al-Andalus
10th-century people from al-Andalus
10th-century philosophers
People from Córdoba, Spain
Islamic philosophers
Sufis from al-Andalus
Scholars from the Caliphate of Córdoba
Philosophers from al-Andalus
10th-century Spanish philosophers
Muwallads
Maliki scholars from al-Andalus